Nature's Baby is a 1971 studio album by Lena Horne, arranged by Ray Ellis.

Track listing
 "Feels So Good" (Ralph MacDonald, William Salter) – 2:58
 "A Song for You" (Leon Russell) – 4:16
 "Maybe I'm Amazed" (Paul McCartney) – 3:37
 "Bein' Green" (Joe Raposo) – 3:24
 "Your Song" (Elton John, Bernie Taupin) – 3:55
 "Mother Time" (Gene McDaniels) – 4:59
 "I Wouldn't Have You Any Other Way (Ain't Nobody Perfect)" (Goade, Wheeler) – 2:47
 "Only the Moon and Me" (N. Calloway, Roberts) – 4:50
 "More Today Than Yesterday" (Pat Upton) – 3:46
 "Think About Your Troubles" (Harry Nilsson) – 3:00
 "Nature's Baby" (McDaniels) – 6:35

Personnel

Performance
Lena Horne – vocals
William Easton - assistant producer
Bob Cato - photography, art direction

References

Lena Horne albums
Buddah Records albums
1971 albums
Albums arranged by Ray Ellis
Albums produced by Ray Ellis
Albums recorded at Electric Lady Studios